Arash Gholizadeh (born January 24, 1990) is an Iranian footballer who plays for Steel Azin F.C. in the Azadegan League.

Club career
Gholizadeh has played his entire career with Malavan F.C.

Club career statistics

 Assist Goals

References

1990 births
Living people
Malavan players
Steel Azin F.C. players
Iranian footballers
Association football defenders
People from Rasht
Sportspeople from Gilan province